The TCR Eastern Europe Trophy (also called the TCR Eastern Europe Trophy powered by ESET for sponsorship reasons) is an annual touring car racing event that is held at various locations across Eastern Europe.

WSC Ltd and Race Event Management signed an agreement, to create the TCR Eastern Europe Trophy. The trophy is only eligible for teams and drivers from Eastern Europe. For 2019, they shared two events with TCR Europe Touring Car Series as well as having four events as part of the ESET V4 Cup.

Champions

References

External links
 

TCR Series
European auto racing series
2019 establishments in Europe